Saint John Cantius Church is a historic Catholic church of the Archdiocese of Chicago known for its architecture, liturgical practices, and affiliation with the Canons Regular of St. John Cantius.

With monumental religious edifices of St. Mary of the Angels, St. Hedwig's or St. Wenceslaus, it is one of the many Polish churches that overlook the Kennedy Expressway.

The unique baroque interior has remained intact for more than a century and is reminiscent of the sumptuous art and architecture of 18th century Kraków. Of all the Polish Cathedral style churches in Chicago, St. John Cantius stands closest to downtown. In 2013, the parish completed a significant restoration. The  tower is readily seen from the nearby Kennedy Expressway and is a landmark in Chicago's West Town neighborhood, located at 825 North Carpenter Street.

History
The arrival and settlement of Polish immigrants in the area, known as “Expatriate Poland”, necessitated the foundation of a new parish which would become Saint John Cantius Church. In 1892, these immigrants petitioned the pastor of St. Stanislaus Kostka, the first Polish church in the Archdiocese, for a new church. Fr. Vincent Barzyński of the Congregation of the Resurrection, saw the validity of this request and immediately purchased several lots at Fry and Carpenter Streets for the sum of $75,000.

Designed by Adolphus Druiding, St. John Cantius Church took five years to build. Work commenced in the spring of 1893. The cornerstone was laid and blessed in July of that year as 50,000 people attended the ceremony. By December, only the crudely finished basement church was completed. The new parish community held its first Mass in the basement on Christmas Eve.

When the edifice was complete, Archbishop Patrick Feehan performed the blessing and dedication ceremonies on December 11, 1898. The parish flourished and reached its peak in 1918 with about 23,000 parishioners and 2,500 children in the school.

The parish retained its Polish character for years, but the building of the Kennedy Expressway which cut through the heart of Chicago's Polonia began a period of decline for the parish as many longtime residents were forced to relocate.  The parish was slated for closure as Chicago's inner city neighborhoods declined further through the 1960s and 70s.

A revival of the parish began in the late 1980s by Fr. Frank Phillips, C.R., who became pastor. Fr. Phillips helped to spark a renewal and attract parishioners, as well as financial resources. With improved finances, Fr. Phillips could begin restoring the physical church to its original glory while preserving the many treasures the parish already had. In 1998, with the approval of Francis Cardinal George, O.M.I., Fr. Phillips founded a new religious community of men, the Canons Regular of St. John Cantius, which now staffs the parish.

A gentrification of the surrounding neighborhood has further contributed to the renewal of the parish. The area that was once known as the “Polish Patch,” is now called “River West,” a developing area with town homes and luxury lofts.

Today, St. John Cantius Church has become a focal center of traditional Latin Catholic rituals and devotions that had fallen out of favor after the Second Vatican Council, such as the Tridentine Mass in Latin as well as Vespers and Benediction, the Corpus Christi procession, the Stations of the Cross, Tenebrae services, and the St. Joseph and St. Anne Novenas.  The parish has a program of sacred music supported by eight parish choirs and an orchestra.

Several famous Poles have visited the church. In March 1989, the parish hosted a visit by Tadeusz Mazowiecki, Prime Minister of the newly-democratic Poland, while in 1998, Józef Glemp, the Cardinal Primate of Poland came to celebrate a Mass of Thanksgiving and bless the church's new copper cupola. In June 2017, Polish MP Malgorzata Gosiewska visited Saint John Cantius as well as a number of other Polish Churches during an official visit to Chicago.

Although the parish's school has closed, the building now houses the Chicago Academy for the Arts, often called the "Fame" school and compared with New York City's High School of Performing Arts.

In December 2021, St. John Cantius announced that in accordance with Cardinal Cupich's implementation of Traditionis custodes, it would cease celebrating the Tridentine Mass at Christmas, Easter, Pentecost, during the Paschal Triduum and the first Sunday of the month beginning in January 2022.

Architecture
The Church building's design is by Adolphus Druiding. Work began on this grandiose structure in the spring of 1893 and was completed by 1898. The building has a façade of rusticated stone in the High Renaissance style which dictated the use of classical elements such as columns, capitals and arches. At the very top is a monumental pediment decorated with the coat of arms of Poland's failed January Uprising, under which is found the inscription "Boże Zbaw Polskę" (God Save Poland in Polish). Just below this on the entablature, is the Latin inscription "Ad maiorem Dei Gloriam", a text which proclaims that this building is for the Greater Glory of God, a Jesuit motto popular in many churches built around the start of the 20th century. Three Romanesque portals set in receding arches lead into the interior.

The interior is in the Baroque style.  Eight stone columns support the vault.  The present decoration is the result of several interior decorations within the first forty years of completion.

The church's main altar, as well as its matching two side altars reputedly originate from the 1893 Columbian Exposition. In 1903 the interior was painted for the first time, and it was at this time that all the plaster and wood ornament were added and the church received the character it has today.  The stained glass windows were made by Gawin Co. of Milwaukee, while the interior murals were painted by Lesiewicz around 1920.  In addition to religious scenes, such as the Resurrection under the main altar, the artist decorated the side walls with paintings of Polish patron saints.

An inlaid hardwood floor was installed in St. John Cantius Church in 1997 in a design by Jed Gibbons. Sixteen varieties of wood from around the world were used for the inlaid medallions. The sacred art of the floor is designed as a teaching tool. The medallions inlaid into the main aisle tell the story of salvation: Star of David—Jesus was born as a Jew; Three Crowns—with the arrival of the Three Kings Jesus was made manifest to the world and, in Christian baptism, one is born priest, prophet, and king; Instruments of the Passion—Christ's suffering for our Salvation; Banner—the Resurrection; Star—Christ is the Light of the World. This floor, which is reputedly the only of its kind in the United States, has already won three national awards.

In 2003, work was completed on a replica of the renowned Veit Stoss Altar of St. Mary's Basilica in Kraków. Carved by artist Michał Batkiewicz over an eight-year period, this imposing one-third scale copy is the largest and most detailed of work of its kind, and was commissioned as a tribute to the Galician immigrants who founded the parish in 1893. The altar was solemnly dedicated by Józef Glemp, the Cardinal Primate of Poland in August 2003.

A permanent exhibit of sacred art is located in the church's north tower. The collection's centerpiece is a Neapolitan "presepio" (Italian for creche) from Rome.  Among St. John Cantius's many other treasures are a nineteenth-century copy of the icon of Our Lady of Częstochowa adorned with jeweled crowns personally blessed by Pope John Paul II; a reproduction of the famous miraculous crucifix from Limpus, Portugal, a nineteenth-century Pietà from Bavaria, Germany, a hand written altar missal on display, as well as several hundred authenticated relics of saints.

St. John Cantius in literature and film
St. John Cantius was featured in two films that were both shot in the summer and fall of 1990. The first was a made-for-television movie, entitled Johnny Ryan. The second was a major Hollywood film entitled, Only the Lonely, directed by John Hughes and starring Maureen O'Hara and John Candy.

St. John Cantius also serves as the backdrop for Steffi Rostenkowski's great realization in Nelson Algren's work Never Come Morning where, night after night, she heard the iron rocking of the bells of Saint John Cantius. Each night they came nearer till the roar of The Loop was only a troubled whimper beneath the rocking of the bells. "Everyone lives in the same big room", she would tell herself, as they rocked. "But nobody's speakin' to anyone else, an' nobody got a key".

St. John Cantius in architecture books
St. John Cantius is featured in a number of books on Chicago architecture, most notably The AIA Guide to Chicago by Alice Sinkevitch (2004). St. John Cantius is found in a number of books on church architecture, among them Heavenly City: The Architectural Tradition of Catholic Chicago by Denis R. McNamara (2005), Chicago Churches and Synagogues: An Architectural Pilgrimage by George A. Lane (1982), Chicago Churches: A Photographic Essay by Elizabeth Johnson (1999), and The Archdiocese of Chicago: A Journey of Faith by Edward R. Kantowicz (2007).

See also
Polish Cathedral style
Poles in Chicago
Adolphus Druiding
Tadeusz Żukotyński

References

External links

 
 PGSA - St. John Cantius Church History
 Archdiocese of Chicago website

Roman Catholic churches in Chicago
Polish-American culture in Chicago
Polish Cathedral style architecture
Roman Catholic churches completed in 1898
19th-century Roman Catholic church buildings in the United States
Resurrectionist Congregation
1893 establishments in Illinois